August-Wilhelm Scheer (born July 27, 1941) is a German Professor of business administration and business information at Saarland University, and founder and director of IDS Scheer AG, a major IT service and software company. He is known for the development of the Architecture of Integrated Information Systems (ARIS) concept.

Biography 
In 1972 Scheer received a PhD from University of Hamburg with the thesis "Kosten- und kapazitätsorientierte Ersatzpolitik bei stochastisch ausfallenden Produktionsanlagen". In 1974 he obtained his Habilitation also in Hamburg with a thesis about project control.

In 1975 Scheer took over one of the first chairs for information systems and founded the institute for information systems (IWi) at Saarland University, which he led until 2005. In 1984 he founded IDS Scheer, a Business Process Management (BPM) software company, which is widely regarded as the founder of the BPM industry. In 1997 he also founded IMC AG, a company for innovative learning technologies and spin-off of Saarland University, together with Wolfgang Kraemer, Frank Milius and Wolfgang Zimmermann.

In 2003 Scheer was awarded the Philip Morris Research Prize and the Ernst & Young Entrepreneur of the Year Award. In December 2005 he was awarded the Erich Gutenberg price and in the same month the Federal Cross of Merit first class. In 2005 he was also elected as a fellow of the Gesellschaft für Informatik. Since 2006, he has been a member of the council for innovation and growth of the Federal Government. 2007 he was honored as a HPI-Fellow by the Hasso-Plattner-Institut (HPI) für Softwaresystemtechnik and was elected President of the German Association for Information Technology, Telecommunications and New Media.

On June 4, 2010 Scheer was awarded with the Design Science Lifetime Achievement Award at University of St. Gallen. He received the prize as a recognition for his contribution to design science research.

Work 
His research focuses on information and business process management in industry, services and administration.

ARIS 

The Architecture of Integrated Information Systems (ARIS) concept, which is the representation of business processes in diagrammatic form so as to provide an unambiguous starting point for the development of computer-based information systems. The ARIS architecture and methodology is the core piece of intellectual property business process management software company IDS Scheer was founded on.

Event-driven Process Chain 

Event-driven Process Chain is a business process modelling technique, mainly used for analysing processes for the purpose of an ERP implementation.

Businesses use EPC diagrams to lay out business process work flows, originally in conjunction with SAP R/3 modeling, but now more widely. There are a number of tools for creating EPC diagrams, including ARIS Toolset of IDS Scheer AG, free modeling tool ARIS Express by IDS Scheer AG, ADONIS of BOC Group, Visio of Microsoft Corp., Semtalk of Semtation GmbH, or Bonapart by Pikos GmbH. Some but not all of these tools support the tool-independent EPC Markup Language (EPML) interchange format.

There are also tools that generate EPC diagrams from operational data, such as SAP logs. EPC diagrams use symbols of several kinds to show the control flow structure (sequence of decisions, functions, events, and other elements) of a business process.

Publications 
His publications attract worldwide attention and were translated in 8 languages. A selection:
 1969. Industrielle Investitionsentscheidung. Eine theoret. u. empir. Untersuchung z. Investitionsverhalten in Industrieunternehmungen.
 1978. Projektsteuerung.
 1984. EDV-orientierte Betriebswirtschaftslehre
 1985. Computer, a challenge for business administration
 1989. Enterprise-wide data modelling : information systems in industry
 1990. CIM-Strategie als Teil der Unternehmensstrategie
 1992. Architecture of integrated information systems : foundations of enterprise modelling.
 1994. Business process engineering : reference models for industrial enterprises.
 1994. CIM : computer integrated manufacturing : towards the factory of the future.
 1998. SAP R/3 in der Praxis : neuere Entwicklungen und Anwendungen. With Dieter B. Pressmar.
 1998. ARIS—business process modeling
 2003. Business process change management : ARIS in practice. Edited with others.
 2006. Agility by Aris business process management : Yearbook business process excellence. Edited with others.
 2006. Corporate performance management : ARIS in practice
 2016. The Complete Business Process Handbook Volume 1: 'Body of Knowledge from Process Modeling to BPM

References

External links 

 Scheer's institute in Saarbrücken (in German)
 Scheer's personal web page
  at ProcessWorld conference 2010 in Berlin
 Scheer's network of high-growth IT companies

1941 births
Living people
German business theorists
Information systems researchers
Enterprise modelling experts
Software engineering researchers
University of Hamburg alumni
Academic staff of Saarland University
Officers Crosses of the Order of Merit of the Federal Republic of Germany
Recipients of the Saarland Order of Merit